Annemarie Esche (29 September 1925 – 13 July 2018) was a German scholar of Burmese literature and linguistics. Following her studies of Burmese as a teacher of German in Burma at the cultural centre of the German Democratic Republikc in Yangon from 1955 to 1963, she later became professor at Humboldt University in Berlin. 

Aside from her linguistic publications, she edited several German collections of Burmese literature. She was the widow of Otto Esche (died 2010), with whom she had cooperated in the compilation of a German-Burmese dictionary.

Works
Esche, Annemarie (1968). Der Markt von Pagan. Prosa aus Burma. Berlin: Verlag Volk und Welt.
Esche, Annemarie (1976). Märchen der Völker Burmas. Wiesbaden: Drei Lilien.
Esche, Annemarie (1976). Wörterbuch burmesisch-deutsch. Leipzig: Verlag Enzyklopädie.
Esche, Annemarie (1985). Die Goldene Pagode: Shwedagon, ein Sinnbild des Buddhismus. Hanau/Main: Müller & Kiepenheuer.
Esche, Annemarie & Eberhard Richter (1988). Burmesisches Übungsbuch. Leipzig. VEB Verlag Enzyklopädie.
Esche, Annemarie (2005). "The experience of writing the first German-Myanmar dictionary." In Justin Watkins (ed.) Studies in Burmese Linguistics. Canberra: Pacific Linguistics, Research School of Pacific and Asian Studies, the Australian National University: 307-318.
Esche, Annemarie & Otto Esche (2011). Wörterbuch Deutsch - Myanma. Hamburg: Helmut Buske Verlag.

References

Burmese studies scholars
German scholars
Women scholars and academics
1925 births
2018 deaths
West German expatriates in Myanmar